Kara Rheault (born November 9, 1975), best known as Kara Ro, is a boxing and MMA trainer, and a retired Canadian boxer. She held the Women's International Boxing Association lightweight title in 2005.

Early life
Ro has enjoyed an extensive career as an athlete and as a professional trainer. As early as the first grade, she received awards for her athleticism. In high school, while maintaining academic excellence, Ro excelled in athletics.  She was a member of eight high school teams including basketball, volleyball, co-ed volleyball, track and field, tennis, badminton, swimming, and baseball.  Ro was awarded M.V.P. in basketball, volleyball, co-ed volleyball, and track and field and was the city champion in tennis and triple jump.

Ro was the youngest player elected to the city's All-Star basketball team and won numerous awards as a tournament All-Star in volleyball. Ro's achievements and leadership awarded her both the junior and the senior athlete of the year awards. As a university student, Ro played volleyball for the University of Windsor. Not only was she elected captain of the team, but she also ranked in the top ten in Canada.

After her second year at university, Ro was introduced to the world of boxing.  After two years in Windsor boxing clubs, Ro decided to go to Detroit, Michigan.  In addition to many outstanding boxing awards in her amateur competitions, Ro won the prestigious Ringside National Tournament.

Boxing career

Ro fought and won all 17 of her pro bouts between 2002 and 2011, and won the vacant Women's International Boxing Association version of the women's world lightweight title in June 2005. Chronic back injuries affected her ability to walk after surgery for extended periods. Ro fought only four times in the next six years.

Radio show

Ro retired to marriage and family life, and has become a noted amateur and professional MMA and boxing trainer in the Windsor, Canada, and Detroit, Michigan areas. She also hosts the Canadian radio show 'TKO with Kara Ro', a noted radio talk show which is unrelated to boxing.

Professional boxing record

References

External links
 
Kara Ro official site

1975 births
Living people
Canadian women boxers
Sportspeople from Windsor, Ontario
Franco-Ontarian people
World boxing champions
Undefeated world boxing champions